Erich Clar (23 August 1902 in Hřensko – 27 March 1987 in Estepona) was an Austrian organic chemist who studied polycyclic aromatic hydrocarbon chemistry. He is considered as the father of that field. In 1941, he authored "Aromatische Kohlenwasserstoffe" (Springer-Verlag) and in 1964 the greatly expanded two-volume Polycyclic Hydrocarbons, which described the syntheses, properties, and UV-visible absorption spectra of hundreds of PAHs. He discovered the Clar reaction of the cyclic ketone perinaphthenone to form dibenzo[cd,lm]perylene in a 400 C melt of zinc dust, zinc (II) chloride, and sodium chloride.  He created the Sextet Theory, now eponymously called Clar's rule, to describe the behavior of polycyclic aromatic hydrocarbon isomers. This was described in his book The Aromatic Sextet. He was awarded the August Kekulé Medal by the Chemical Society of the GDR in 1965, the highest award given by that society to foreign scientists, and the first Polycyclic Aromatic Hydrocarbon Research Award of the International Symposium on Polynuclear Aromatic Hydrocarbons in 1987.

See also
Clar's hydrocarbon
Clar's rule
Iptycene

References 

1902 births
1987 deaths
20th-century German chemists
Organic chemists
People from Děčín District
TU Dresden alumni
Academics of the University of Glasgow
German emigrants to Scotland
Sudeten German people